Greater Bangladesh (among other names, see below) is a theory that the People's Republic of Bangladesh has aspirations of territorial expansion, to include the Indian states of West Bengal, Tripura and Assam's Barak valley, Hojai and Undivided Goalpara as part of its own territory in years to come.

Names 
It is known by various names in Bengali. ; ; ;  and

Partition of Bengal (1905) 
During the Partition of Bengal 1905, (translated variously as Bengali: বঙ্গভঙ্গ, romanized: Bônggôbhônggô) - when the ruling British empire had the province of Bengal (of undivided India) split into two parts, many Bengali intellectuals joined cultural and political movement against the partition. The partition took place in October 1905 and separated the largely Muslim eastern areas from the largely Hindu western areas. The Hindus of West Bengal who dominated Bengal's business and rural life complained that the division would make them a minority in a province that would incorporate the Bihar and Orissa Province. It was during this time the Mother Bengal was an immensely popular theme in Bengali patriotic songs and poems and was mentioned in several of them, such as the song ″Dhana Dhanya Pushpa Bhara″ and ″Banga Amar Janani Amar″ (Our Bengal Our Mother) by Dwijendralal Ray. These songs were meant to rekindle the unified spirit of Bengal, to raise public consciousness against the communal political divide.

Partition of Bengal (1947) 

The Partition of Bengal in 1947, part of the Partition of India, divided the British Indian province of Bengal based on the Radcliffe Line between the Dominion of India and the Dominion of Pakistan. The Hindu-majority West Bengal became a state of India, and the Muslim-majority East Bengal (now Bangladesh) became a province of Pakistan.

On 20 June 1947, the Bengal Legislative Assembly met to decide the future of the Bengal Presidency on being a United Bengal within India or Pakistan or divided into East and West Bengal. At the preliminary joint session, the assembly decided by 120-90 that it should remain united if it joined the new Constituent Assembly of Pakistan. Later, a separate meeting of legislators from West Bengal decided 58-21 that the province should be partitioned and that West Bengal should join the existing Constituent Assembly of India. In another separate meeting of legislators from East Bengal, it was decided 106-35 that the province should not be partitioned and 107-34 that East Bengal should join Pakistan in the event of Partition.

On 6 July 1947, the Sylhet referendum decided to sever Sylhet from Assam and merge it into East Bengal.

The partition, with power transferred to Pakistan and India on 14–15 August 1947, was done according to what has come to be known as the 3 June Plan, or the Mountbatten Plan. Indian independence, on 15 August 1947, ended over 150 years of British influence in the Indian subcontinent. East Bengal became the independent country of Bangladesh after the 1971 Bangladesh Liberation War.

United Bengal

After the Battle of Plassey, the region became an administrative division of British India with Bengal's capital Calcutta acting as the Indian capital. The Bengal Presidency was formed in 1765, and in 1905, the presidency was divided into Bengal province and Eastern Bengal and Assam province. Assam and the Lushai Hills became part of the Province of Assam in 1912. In 1912, Bengal was separated into two states of the British empire after the Indian independence movement began to arise. These new provinces were Bihar and Orissa and East Bengal and Assam. These provinces were partitioned again in 1947 into the Hindu-majority West Bengal and Muslim-majority East Bengal (now Bangladesh) to facilitate the creation of the separate Muslim state of Pakistan, of which East Bengal became a province.

In January 1947, Father of Independent state of Bangalarastra Sarat Chandra Bose resigned from the Indian National Congress, partially in protest against the partition of Bengal. He called for an independent state of Bengal separate from both India and Pakistan. Huseyn Shaheed Suhrawardy and Abul Hashem, two Bengali leaders of the Muslim League, also advocated for an independent state of Bengal comprising both the eastern and western parts of Bengal (now Bangladesh and West Bengal, respectively).

Mohammad Akram Khan and Khawaja Nazimuddin, two other Muslim League leaders, wanted a United Bengal as part of Pakistan. Akhil Bharatiya Hindu Mahasabha and Syama Prasad Mookerjee, the founder of Bharatiya Jana Sangh which later was succeeded by Bharatiya Janata Party (BJP), opposed the idea of an independent Bengal or a United Bengal. Hindu Mahashabha and Mookerjee were concerned about Bose and Suhrawardy discussing a sovereign state of Bengal.Jawaharlal Nehru, then a leader of the majority faction of the Congress, was opposed to a United Bengal unless it was connected to the Union.

Theories

Lebensraum theory

Achieving a "Greater Bangladesh" as Lebensraum (additional living space) is alleged to be the reason for large-scale illegal immigration from Bangladesh into India's states. Similarly it is alleged that illegal immigration is actively encouraged by some political groups in Bangladesh as well as the state of Bangladesh to convert large parts of India's northeastern states, particularly Assam and West Bengal into Muslim-majority areas that would subsequently seek to separate from India and join Muslim-majority Bangladesh. The proposition is that the state of Bangladesh is pursuing a territorial design seeking a Lebensraum for its teeming population and trying to establish a Greater Bangladesh.

Migration theory

At the turn of the 21st century, Indian political circles started to take a serious look at Bangladeshi illegal immigration into India.  According to Jyoti M. Pathania of South Asia Analysis Group the reasons for Bangladeshi immigration to India are: basic need theory i.e. food, shelter and clothing, economic dictates i.e. employment opportunity, better wages and comparatively better living conditions, demographic disproportion especially for minorities (Hindus) in this densely populated country having roughly a density of 780 per km2 as against half that number on Indian side of the border, and being cheap labor the Bangladeshis find easy acceptance as "domestic helps" in Indian homes, which keeps proliferating by ever increasing demand for domestic helps. The Centre for Women and Children Studies estimated in 1998 that 27,000 Bangladeshis have been forced into prostitution in India. 

Though about 1.2 million Indians are living in Bangladesh illegally.

Militancy theory

A number of Indian politicians and journalists alleged that advocates of a Greater Bangladesh seek the expansion of Bangladeshi hegemony in Northeastern India, including the states of Assam, West Bengal, Meghalaya and Tripura, as well as the Arakan Province of Burma (Myanmar), where there is a considerable population of Rohingya Muslims. It was also alleged that United Liberation Front of Asom (ULFA) conspired with state of Bangladesh to secede four to five Muslim majority districts of Assam to form a Greater Bangladesh, though Bangladesh in the contrary arrested a number of ULFA leaders, including Ranju Chowdhury, Arabinda Rajkhowa and Anup Chetia, to support Indian action against militancy.

In 2002, nine Islamic groups including Indian militant organizations Muslim United Liberation Tigers of Assam (MULTA), Muslim United Liberation Front of Assam (MULFA) and Muslim Volunteer Force (MVF), Pakistani militant organization Harkat-ul-Mujahideen (HUM), Myanmar groups Rohingya Solidarity Organization (RSO) and Arakan Rohingya Islamic Front of Myanmar (ARIFM), and Harkat-ul-Jihad al-Islami, a pan-South Asian militant organization outlawed in Bangladesh with leaders sentenced to death, formed a coalition that declared the formation Greater Bangladesh as one of their aims.

Basis of theories

Nellie massacre

In Assam, agitation against immigrants started as early as 1979, led by All Assam Students Union. Their demand was to put a stop on the influx of immigrants and deportation of those who have already settled. It gradually took violent form and ethnic violence started between Assamese and Bengalis, mostly Muslim. It eventually led to the infamous Nellie massacre in 1983 due to a controversy over the 1983 election. In 1985 Indian Government signed the Assam accord with the leaders of the agitation to stop the issue. As per the accord India started building a fence along the Assam-Bangladesh border which is now almost complete. However Assam also has a large number of genuine Indian Muslim Bengalis. It is difficult to distinguish between illegal Bangladeshis and local Bengali speakers. In some cases genuine Indian citizens have been discriminated 

Ethnic and religious tensions in the Indian North East had led to massacre of Bengali-speaking Muslims in Nellie in February 1983. The greatest carnage against immigrants occurred on 18 February when 990 in Nellie and 585 in Barbori were killed. Villages were burned while women and children identified as immigrant Muslims were hacked into pieces. Smuggling and illegal immigration along the Indian-Bangladeshi border has been identified as major cause of killing of more than 3,000 people in the massacre. The Nellie Massacre has been argued as one of the cases of ethnic cleansing, that was followed by similar incidents of carnages in Delhi (1984), Bhagalpur (1989), Kashmir (1990s), Mumbai (1993) and Gujarat (2002).

The Sinha Report

In 1998, Lieutenant General S.K. Sinha, then the Governor of Assam and later the Governor of Jammu and Kashmir, wrote a report to K.R. Narayanan, then the President of India claiming that massive illegal immigration from Bangladesh was directly linked with "the long-cherished design of Greater Bangladesh," and also quoted pre-1971 comments from late Pakistani Prime Minister Zulfiqar Ali Bhutto and late President of Bangladesh Sheikh Mujibur Rahman endorsing the inclusion of Assam into East Pakistan (now Bangladesh). Anxiety and popular anger over illegal immigration prompted political unrest in the state of Assam, and criticism has increased over the Indian government's failure to secure its borders with Bangladesh and stop the illegal immigration.

Notes

References

Bangladesh–India relations
Conspiracy theories in India
Geography of Bangladesh
Politics of Bangladesh
Politics of India